Daniel Swanson (born July 30, 1959) is a Republican member of the Illinois House of Representatives, representing the 74th district which includes Mercer, Henry, Knox, Bureau and Lee counties in western Illinois. A native of Woodhull, he served as a member of the Henry County Board and a lieutenant colonel in the Illinois Army National Guard (1977-2001, 2007-2008) prior to his election to the Illinois House of Representatives.

As of July 3, 2022, Representative Swanson is a member of the following Illinois House committees:

 Agriculture & Conservation Committee (HAGC)
 Appropriations - Public Safety Committee (HAPP)
 Elementary & Secondary Education: School Curriculum & Policies (HELM)
 Firefighters and First Responders Subcommittee (SHPF-FIRE)
 Mental Health & Addiction Committee (HMEH)
 Police & Fire Committee (SHPF)
 Transportation: Vehicles & Safety Committee (HVES)
 Veterans' Affairs Committee (HVET)

References

External links
 Profile at Illinois General Assembly

1959 births
Living people
People from Henry County, Illinois
Military personnel from Illinois
Farmers from Illinois
Republican Party members of the Illinois House of Representatives
County board members in Illinois
21st-century American politicians